Fatma Şahin (born December 15, 1990) is a Turkish women's football goalkeeper currently playing in the Turkish Women's First Football League for Beşiktaş with jersey number 1. She was a member of the Turkey women's national team.

Early life 
Fatma Şahin was born on December 15, 1990, in Çiğli, İzmir, where her mother is a native of. She is the second child of the family's three daughters. She grew up in Istanbul and Gebze. The family moved to Izmir as their house in Gebze was damaged by the 1999 İzmit earthquake.

She studies football coaching at the College of Physical Education and Sports of Ege University in İzmir, and will graduate in 2014.

Club career 

Şahin began playing football in Elit Çimenspor, a Balçova-based club in her hometown, after receiving her license on October 22, 2004. Some years later, she wanted to leave the club for the newly established Konak Belediyespor due to disagreement with her coach. However, her club did not release her license, and so she had to take part only at training sessions of Konakspor Belediyespor for one-and-half years. In February 2008, she transferred officially to Konak Belediyespor, where she plays since then.

She made her first appearance in the 2013–14 UEFA Women's Champions League qualifying round match playing against the Bulgarian team FC NSA Sofia on August 8, 2013. Her team managed as the first ever Turkish women's club to make it into the Round of 16. However, the Austrian opponent SV Neulengbach eliminated Konak Belediyespor in two games while Şahin was not able to save the six goals in total. She took part in her team's three matches at the 2014–15 UEFA Women's Champions League qualifying round.

In the 2015–16 season, she transferred to 1207 Antalya Muratpaşa Belediye Spor, which was newly promoted from the Women's Second League.

After two seasons, she returned to her former club Konak Belediyespor. Şahin played in three matches of the 2017–18 UEFA Women's Champions League qualifying round in Tbilisi, Georgia.

In the 2018–19 league season, she transferred to Beşiktaş J.K. She enjoyed the champion title of her team in the 2018–19 season. She took part at the 2019–20 UEFA Women's Champions League - Group 9 matches.

In the 2020-21 Turkcell Women's Football League season, she enjoyed the second champion title with her team Beşiktaş J.K. She was honored with the award of Best goalkeeper of the 2020–21 season. She played in two matches of the 2021–22 UEFA Women's Champions League qualifying rounds.

International career 

Şahin made her national team debut in the friendly match against Macedonia women's national football team held on January 22, 2006, entering the game on the 82nd minute. After playing one more match with the national U-19 team, she became a member of the senior team in 2009. As of April 7, 2018, she capped 16 times in the national team.

Career statistics 
.

Honours

Club 
 Turkish Women's First League
 Konak Belediyespor
 Winners (3): 2012–13, 2013–14, 2014–15
 Runners-up (1): 2010–11
 Third place (2): 2009–10, 2017–18

 Beşiktaş J.K.
 Winners (2): 2018–19, 2020–21

Individual 
 Best goalkeeper: 2020–21 with Beşiktaş J.K.

References 

1990 births
Living people
Footballers from İzmir
Ege University alumni
Turkish women's footballers
Women's association football goalkeepers
Turkey women's international footballers
Konak Belediyespor players
1207 Antalya Spor players
Turkish Women's Football Super League players
Beşiktaş J.K. women's football players
21st-century Turkish sportswomen